This is a list of Harlequin Romance novels released in 2012.

Releases

References 

Lists of Harlequin Romance novels
2012 novels